The 2007 Army Black Knights football team represented the United States Military Academy as an independent in the 2007 NCAA Division I FBS football season. The Black Knights, led by first-year head coach Stan Brock, played their home games at the Michie Stadium.

Schedule

Personnel

Season summary

Tulane

"The Michie Miracle"

References

Army
Army Black Knights football seasons
Army Black Knights football